Tetso College is a co-educational arts, commerce and management college with its main college campus located at Sovima in the Chümoukedima District of Nagaland in India. It offers Higher Secondary, Undergraduate and Post Graduate courses. The college is affiliated to Nagaland University and NBSE. P. S. Lorin and Shasinle Lorin are the Founders of Tetso College. The college is sponsored by the Council of Rengma Baptist Churches (CRBC). The name of the college "Tetso" is taken from the indigenous Rengma Naga language word meaning "top".

Campus

References

External links
 Tetso College Official Website

Colleges affiliated to Nagaland University
Universities and colleges in Nagaland
Chümoukedima
Educational institutions established in 1994
1994 establishments in Nagaland